The village of Ijegun is a northern suburban community in Alimosho Local Government Area of Lagos State, Nigeria.

The area is home to oil tank farms.

History
On May 15, 2008, Ijegun was devastated by a massive explosion, killing over 100 people, after a bulldozer struck and ignited an oil pipeline.

Another pipeline explosion occurred in 2019.

References

Populated places in Lagos State